Mae Clouther (1917-February 1, 1997) was a female United States international table tennis player.

She won a bronze medal at the 1947 World Table Tennis Championships in the women's team and a silver medal in the women's doubles with Reba Monness.

She was inducted into the USA Table Tennis Hall of Fame in 1984.

See also
 List of table tennis players
 List of World Table Tennis Championships medalists

References

American female table tennis players
1917 births
1997 deaths
World Table Tennis Championships medalists
20th-century American women
20th-century American people